Carabus hemprichii is a species of ground beetle in the family Carabidae. It is found in Israel, Lebanon, Syria, and Turkey.

Subspecies
These six subspecies belong to the species Carabus hemprichii:
 Carabus hemprichii cheikhermonensis Deuve, 1992  (Israel and Lebanon)
 Carabus hemprichii damascenus Lapouge, 1925  (Israel and Syria)
 Carabus hemprichii elonensis Schweiger, 1970  (Israel)
 Carabus hemprichii hemprichii Dejean, 1826  (Lebanon and Syria)
 Carabus hemprichii kairouzi A.Müller, 2008  (Lebanon)
 Carabus hemprichii propheta Rapuzzi, 1995  (Turkey)

References

Carabus
Beetles described in 1826
Beetles of Asia